Hai'er Road is a station of the Qingdao Metro on Line 3, which opened on 16 December 2015. The station is near the headquarters of Haier.

References

Qingdao Metro stations
Railway stations in China opened in 2015